"Bad Blood" is a story arc that ran through Buffy the Vampire Slayer #9–11, 13–15, and 17–19, based on the Buffy the Vampire Slayer television series. The arc was later collected into trade paperback editions, three issues to a volume.

Story description

General synopsis
In the first three issues, Buffy thinks about pursuing a career in modeling whilst Selke, a vampire who Buffy hoped had been killed at a mausoleum fire, comes back and recruits a plastic surgeon to solve her cosmetic problems.

Over the next three, Sunnydale is becoming an increasingly dangerous place to dust the undead. Buffy must once again face her old enemy Selke. Selke has returned with 'bad blood', a supernatural ingredient that may massively increase her powers.

Over the lat three, Selke gets closer and closer to destroying the Slayer. Buffy must literally face her dark side.

"Hey, Good Lookin', part 1"

Selke comes back for revenge against those who wronged her.

"Hey, Good Lookin', part 2"

As Buffy is looking into a modeling career, Selke is getting back her strength at the local vampire coven.

"A Boy Named Sue"

Selke and her Doctor continue their evil scheming and come up with a solution to Selke's 'cosmetic' issues. Meanwhile, a dumped student at Sunnydale High learns an important lesson about relations between genders.

"Delia's Gone"

Cordelia Chase has always been proud of her beauty, popularity, and perfect fashion sense, and considers such qualities as natural to her. However, an unknown beauty is beginning to challenge Cordelia's spotlight from the men of Sunnydale. Cordelia hopes that an upcoming quiz-show contest can put her back in the spotlight.

"Love Sick Blues"

Sunnydale is becoming an increasingly dangerous place to dust the undead. Buffy begins to suspect something is wrong. Spike and Dru, having just returned to Sunnydale, are not happy to find Selke set up as the local 'big bad'. Meanwhile, Buffy starts to question her relationship with Angel. Also Selke and her Doctor have plans for an ancient Slayer relic.

"Lost Highway"

Whilst Buffy is doing her best to try to obtain her Driver's License, Selke and the Doctor are planning disaster for the town. Meanwhile, it seems the super-vampires that have been plaguing the town have not yet gone. Buffy does her best to balance driving and slaying.

"She's No Lady, part 1"

Puzzlingly, it appears that Buffy and Xander kiss. Sunnydale must try to comprehend such an event and its connection with the super vampires. Meanwhile, Selke walks the sewers of the town.

"She's No Lady, part 2"

Mardi Gras is approaching. Strangely, Buffy seems to be becoming obsessive about her looks, and her friends investigate. Meanwhile, as Angel is trying to discover the origins of Sunnydale's new super vampires, his life maybe in danger.

"Old Friend"

Buffy and the gang have now been trying to eradicate the super-powered vampires and slayer copies for months. Selke finally comes out of her hiding place, but Buffy's not as fast as she should be.

Collected editions
The story arc was reprinted over three trade paperbacks, each containing three of the issues:
Buffy the Vampire Slayer: Bad Blood (2000) 88 pages
Buffy the Vampire Slayer: Crash Test Demons (2000) 80 pages
Buffy the Vampire Slayer: Pale Reflections (2001) 88 pages

Continuity
Supposed to be set in Buffy season 3. Takes place immediately after "The Final Cut", and immediately before Angel: The Hollower.

Canonical issues

Buffy comics such as this one are not usually considered by fans as canonical. Some fans consider them stories from the imaginations of authors and artists, while other fans consider them as taking place in an alternative fictional reality. However unlike fan fiction, overviews summarising their story, written early in the writing process, were 'approved' by both Fox and Joss Whedon (or his office), and the books were therefore later published as officially Buffy merchandise.